CFQR (600 AM) is an English-language radio station in Montreal, Quebec.

On June 28, 2017, a test broadcast began on AM 600 by TTP Media, the same owners as CFNV. The call sign was announced as CFQR (no relation to the former CFQR-FM, now CKBE-FM).

On June 13, 2022, CFQR launched its morning drive program, Mornings Matter. The program is hosted by Jim Connell, a former host at CINW and CKMI-DT. In connection with the launch, CFQR stated that its programming would feature news, information, and talk, along with music from the 1970s, 1980s, and 1990s.

Ownership
The radio station is owned by a numbered company, 7954689 Canada Inc. operating in Montreal, Quebec, Canada. It is equally controlled by:

4158695 Canada Inc. (Paul Tietolman)
9225-8318 Québec Inc. (Nicolas Tétrault)
6556027 Canada Inc. (Rajiv Pancholy)

The group is collectively known as TTP Media, which reflects the surnames of the three owners, Tietolman, Tétrault and Pancholy.

References

External links
 
 
 

Fqr
Fqr
Fqr
Radio stations established in 2017
Fqr
2017 establishments in Quebec